Kingsford Smith Drive, is a main road in the district of Belconnen in Canberra, Australia and is named in honour of Sir Charles Kingsford Smith.

Primarily a dual carriageway road between the intersection of Drake Brockman Drive in Higgins and a termination point at Kuringa Drive in Spence, Kingsford Smith drive follows an approximate north–south alignment with a distance of around 7.2 km. The speed limit is 80 km/h for the southern ⅔ of the road until a point between Ginninderra Drive and Companion Crescent where the limit drops to 70 km/h for the climb towards Mt Rogers. Kingsford Smith Drive intersects with the major roads of Ginninderra Drive, Southern Cross Drive and Belconnen Way.

Kingsford Smith Drive is the major dividing road between the suburbs of Spence, Flynn, Latham and Higgins on the west, with the suburbs of   Melba, Florey and Scullin on the east.

Kingsford Smith Drive north of Ginninderra Drive is considered to be a high accident road with numerous deaths occurring there since the road was created in the late 1970s, and there is sign warning drivers about this. The most recent fatal accident occurred on 21 May 2022 when a 21-year-old man lost control of his car and collided with a tree near Verbrugghen St in Melba. The driver died at the scene, while the male passenger was taken to the Canberra Hospital in a serious condition.

See also

External links 

Man killed in car crash - Daily Telegraph

Streets in Canberra
Roads in the Australian Capital Territory